Amrit Dhara is a natural waterfall located in Manendragarh-Chirmiri-Bharatpur district, state of Chhattisgarh, India. It originates from the Hasdeo River, which is a tributary of the Mahanadi River. The fall is situated at a distance of 50 km from Chirmiri and 30 km from Manendragarh. The waterfall is ideally located on the Manendragarh-Baikunthpur road NH 43.

History
This Amrit Dhara waterfall, manendragarh is a situated is also famous for a very auspicious Shiva temple. Around the spot a very famous mela is held every year. This mela was a started by Ramanuj Pratap Singhu deo, who was the King of Koriya State, in the year 1936. The fair takes place during the festival occasion of Mahashiv Ratri and lakhs of devotees come to take the place during the fair.

The area around is also a famous picnic spot, especially for families. The beauty of the place enchants every visitor and lures them to visit the place on and often.

Geography
The fall's coordinates are 23°19'55 N 82°19'14 E. The Climate is Dry Climate and 
Temperature is Max - 40C, Min - 30C.

Transport

Air
The nearest airport is Raipur (Swami Vivekananda Airport Raipur, approx. 330 km from the place)

Train
The nearest railway station is 20 km away at Manendragarh.
Another nearby railway station is Chirimiri that is approx. 50 km away.

Road
20 km from the town Manendragarh. Road, take a bus or taxi to Nagpur, and hire a taxi to the fall.

See also
 Nagpur
 Tourism in Chhattisgarh

References

Waterfalls of Chhattisgarh
Koriya district